Reshitelny was one of 29 s (officially known as Project 7) built for the Soviet Navy during the late 1930s. Originally named Pospeshny, she was renamed Reshitelny before completion in 1941, and was assigned to the Pacific Fleet. She was sold to People's Liberation Army Navy in 1955 and renamed Changchun. Currently she is preserved as a museum ship.

Design and description
Having decided to build the large and expensive   destroyer leaders, the Soviet Navy sought Italian assistance in designing smaller and cheaper destroyers.

Their crew numbered 197 officers and sailors in peacetime and 236 in wartime. The designers had been conservative in rating the turbines and many, but not all, of the ships handily exceeded their designed speed during their sea trials. Others fell considerably short of it, although specific figures for most individual ships have not survived.

As built, the Gnevny-class ships mounted four  B-13 guns in two pairs of superfiring single mounts fore and aft of the superstructure. Anti-aircraft defense was provided by a pair of  34-K AA guns in single mounts and a pair of  21-K AA guns as well as two  DK or DShK machine guns. They carried six  torpedo tubes in two rotating triple mounts; each tube was provided with a reload. The ships could also carry a maximum of either 60 or 95 mines and 25 depth charges. The ships were equipped with two K-1 paravanes intended to destroy mines and a pair of depth-charge throwers.

Construction and service 
Major components for the ship that became Reshitelny were laid down at Shipyard No. 198 (Andre Marti South) in Nikolayev on 23 August 1936 as yard number 324 and were then railed to Shipyard No. 199 at Komsomolsk-on-Amur, Siberia, for completion where the ship was laid down again on 23 August 1937 as Pospeshny. She was launched on 30 April 1940 and was renamed Reshitelny on 25 August before she was commissioned on 5 September 1941. She was sold to China in 1955 and renamed Changchun and decommissioned in the 1990. She is currently a museum ship in the beach of Rushan, Shandong.

Citations

Sources

Further reading
 

Gnevny-class destroyers
1940 ships
Ships built at the Black Sea Shipyard
Museum ships in China